Skeletonbreath is a Brooklyn, New York based Instrumental rock trio signed to Ernest Jenning Records. Their music has been self-described as "Transylvanian Surf Rock" and "Halloween party music." The band is composed of Andrew Platt on electric bass, Bob Pycior on electric violin, and Tris Palazzolo on drums.  Their debut album, "Louise" was independently released in 2005 and has been described by TheHVScene.com as "A perfect CD." They were recently featured in Progression Magazine  after having opened at the two-day-long Progday festival. They have also received acclaim in the Orlando City Beat, and are featured on the DIY website Ruberecords.org.
Despite having acquired much notoriety within the New York music scene, Skeletonbreath has retained a strong DIY ethic, playing in basements and living rooms as often as at festivals.

History

Andrew Platt, Crockett Doob and Bob Pycior grew up together in upstate New York, and played together in a number of short-lived groups throughout middle school and high school. In the summer of 2002 the three formed Skeletonbreath while home from college, and shortly after began touring the northeast. Bob Pycior played in Kiss Kiss before quitting in 2005 in favor of Skeletonbreath, causing what appears to have become a lasting rivalry between the two groups. In 2007, Doob left the band to pursue other creative interests, including assisting in the production of a film and writing a novel, and was replaced by Tris Palazzolo after a series of auditions for the role. A second full-length album, "Eagle's Nest, Devil's Cave," was released on May 19, 2009 on Ernest Jenning Records.

Discography

Albums
 Louise (Self-Released)  (2006)
 Eagle's Nest, Devil's Cave (Ernest Jenning)  (2009)
 Eagle's Nest, Devil's Cave (500 press run Vinyl Format LP with CD included)(Safety Meeting Records)  (2009)

Sources 
Punk News
Official Myspace Page
Official Website
Progression Magazine
Ruberecords

References 

Musical groups established in 2002
Musical groups from Brooklyn
American musical trios
2002 establishments in New York City